Erin Reelick (born December 13, 1993) is an American rower. In the 2018 World Rowing Championships, she won a gold medal in the women's coxless four event.

References

External links

American female rowers
World Rowing Championships medalists for the United States
Living people
1993 births
21st-century American women